Arial Benabent Mendy (born 7 November 1994) is a Senegalese professional footballer who plays as a left-back for French  club Grenoble.

Career
In 2017, while playing for Diambars FC, Mendy was capped for Senegal. He made his professional debut with RC Lens in a 2–0 Ligue 2 win over US Orléans on 27 July 2018.

On 7 August 2020, Mendy joined Swiss Super League club Servette FC.

He joined French club Clermont Foot in July 2021.

In January 2023, Mendy joined Grenoble on a two-and-a-half year deal having agreed to the mutual termination of his Clermont contract.

References

External links
 RC Lens Profile

1994 births
Living people
People from Ziguinchor
Association football defenders
Senegalese footballers
Diambars FC players
RC Lens players
US Orléans players
Servette FC players
Clermont Foot players
Grenoble Foot 38 players
Ligue 2 players
Swiss Super League players
Ligue 1 players
Championnat National 3 players
Senegalese expatriate footballers
Senegalese expatriate sportspeople in France
Expatriate footballers in France
Senegalese expatriate sportspeople in Switzerland
Expatriate footballers in Switzerland
Senegal international footballers